The Gainesville Midland Subdivision is a railroad line owned by CSX Transportation in the U.S. State of Georgia. At its south end it branches off from the Abbeville Subdivision and at its north end the track comes to an end. The purpose of this line is to connect the CSX Abbeville Subdivision with the Norfolk Southern Piedmont District.

See also
 List of CSX Transportation lines

References

CSX Transportation lines